No Goodbyes is a 1977 collection by Hall & Oates.  It is a "Best of" compilation of their first three Atlantic Records recordings. No Goodbyes was released after the duo left Atlantic and joined RCA Records, and after Atlantic had achieved a Top 10 hit with a re-release of "She's Gone" (included here). It contains three new songs: "It's Uncanny," "I Want to Know You for a Long Time," and "Love You Like a Brother." The latter two of these were later released on The Atlantic Collection. "It's Uncanny" was released as a single upon this album's release but failed to break the Billboard Top 40, reaching only #80. "Love You Like a Brother" was re-released on the 2009 four-disc box set Do What You Want, Be What You Are, as was "It's Uncanny."

Track listing
Side one
"It's Uncanny" – 3:43
"I Want to Know You for a Long Time" – 3:19
"Can't Stop the Music (He Played It Much Too Long)" – 2:43
"Love You Like a Brother" – 3:22
"Las Vegas Turnaround (The Stewardess Song)" – 2:57

Side two
"She's Gone" – 5:15
"Lilly (Are You Happy)" – 4:10
"When the Morning Comes" – 3:12
"Beanie G. and the Rose Tattoo" – 3:00
"70's Scenario" – 3:57

References

Hall & Oates compilation albums
1977 compilation albums
Atlantic Records compilation albums